Liberia is divided into fifteen first-level administrative divisions called counties, which, in turn, are subdivided into a total of 90 second-level administrative divisions called districts and further subdivided into third-level administrative divisions called clans.

After its independence in 1847, and over the course of the nineteenth century, Liberia's administrative divisions grew from the original three counties - Montserrado, Grand Bassa, and Sinoe - to the addition of Maryland and Grand Cape Mount, extending along the windward coast between Cape Mount and Cape Palmas. Under President Arthur Barclay's administration (1904-1912), a new system was established in response to British and French demands that the Liberian government effectively occupy the territory Liberia had claimed. Three inland provinces were created - Western, Central, and Eastern - and each province was divided into several districts. The administrative districts were further sub-divided into clans. The districts were administered by the newly created office of district commissioner and the clans by the newly created office of paramount chief, all appointed by the president. In 1964, under President William Tubman's 'Unification' policy, the three inland provinces were disestablished, and the inland administrative divisions were reconstituted into four new counties: Grand Gedeh, Nimba, Bong, and Lofa, administered by superintendents who were appointed by the president.

In 1984, under President Samuel Doe, Grand Kru and Bomi counties were established. In 1985, two more counties were created: Margibi and Rivercess. The last two current counties were created under President Charles Taylor: River Gee in 2000 and Gbarpolu in 2001.

Governance 

The fifteen counties are administered by superintendents, and the districts by commissioners, all appointed by the president. The cabinet office with responsibility for the management of the superintendents, commissioners and chiefs is the Minister of Internal Affairs. The 1985 Constitution calls for the election of various chiefs at the county and local level. These elections have not taken place since 1985 due to war and financial constraints.

Counties 

There are 15 counties in Liberia.

Districts 

Bomi County 
Dewoin District
Klay District
Mecca District
Senjeh District
Bong County 
Fuamah District
Jorquelleh District
Kokoyah District
Panta-Kpa District
Salala District
Sanayea District
Suakoko District
Zota District
Gbarpolu County 
Belleh District
Bopolu District
Bokomu District
Kongba District
Gbarma District
Grand Bassa County 
District #1
District #2
District #3
District #4
Owensgrove District
St. John River District
Grand Cape Mount County 
Commonwealth District
Garwula District
Gola Konneh District
Porkpa District
Tewor District
Grand Gedeh County 
Gbarzon District
Konobo District
Tchien District
Grand Kru County 
Buah District
Lower Kru Coast District
Sasstown District
Upper Kru Coast District

Lofa County 
Foya District
Kolahun District
Salayea District
Vahun District
Voinjama District
Quardu Gboni District
Zorzor District
Margibi County 
Firestone District
Gibi District
Kakata District
Mambah-Kaba District
Maryland County 
Barrobo District
Pleebo/Sodeken District
Montserrado County 
Careysburg District
Greater Monrovia District
St. Paul River District
Todee District
Nimba County 
Gbehlageh District
Saclepea District
Sanniquelleh-Mahn District
Tappita District
Yarwein-Mehnsohnneh District
Zoegeh District
River Gee County 
Gbeapo District
Webbo District
Rivercess County 
Morweh District
Timbo District
Sinoe County
Butaw District
Dugbe River District
Greenville District
Jaedae Jaedepo District
Juarzon District
Kpayan District
Pyneston District

Clans 

The Clans of Liberia were local political units created by the central government as part of its efforts to extend its authority and influence into the interior of the country. As the tier of administrative government beneath the districts of Liberia, the clan structure only loosely corresponded to historic local political entities. Clans were legally recognized through legislation in 1905 and 1912. 
In a number of cases the clans, each under a chief, were combined under larger units called chiefdoms and headed by a paramount chief.  Clans and chiefdoms were in some cases parts of a limited number of officially-recognized tribes.   Under that system, indigenous Africans were regarded as corporate members of their respective groups rather than as individual citizens of Liberia. Clan land was owned communally and could be alienated only with the agreement of the chiefs.  Over time, the units of clans and chiefdoms gradually merged into the state. The County Council, affirmed in the Budget Act of 2012, has now replaced informal town hall meetings and includes a broad representation of citizen groups, districts, chiefdoms and clans.

See also 
 Geography of Liberia

References 

Subdivisions of Liberia